Michael William Hodgetts  (29 March 1936 – 12 December 2022) was an English Catholic historian who became a leading expert on priest holes and on Harvington Hall.

Early life 
Hodgetts was born in Birmingham on 29 March 1936, and was raised a Catholic. He attended King Edward's School, Birmingham and then studied Classics at Worcester College, Oxford, as well as briefly studying as a seminarian at the Venerable English College, Rome, before becoming a teacher at St Thomas More Catholic School, Willenhall.

Career 
In the 1970s and 1980s, he sat on the International Commission on English in the Liturgy, alongside his work as a teacher, and his translation of the hymn Pange lingua is now used in the English-language Catholic liturgy for Good Friday.

In 1984, he was appointed to the management committee of Harvington Hall, a former manor house and centre of Recusancy that had been given to the Archdiocese of Birmingham in 1923. He edited the volumes series of the Catholic Record Society and the society's journal, Recusant History (now British Catholic History). In 1989 he retired from school-teaching and joined the staff of Maryvale Institute, a Catholic college of further and higher education.

Personal life 
He married Barbara in 1969. They had four children.

Hodgetts died on 12 December 2022, at the age of 86.

Works
 St. Chad's Cathedral, Birmingham (1987)
 Secret Hiding Places (1989)
 Midlands Catholic Buildings (1990)
 Harvington Hall (1991,1998)
  Life at Harvington, 1250-2000 (2002)
  Midland Martyrs, 1580-1680 (2017)
 (with Aileen M. Hodgson), Little Malvern Letters—I: 1482-1737 (2011)
 (with Aileen M. Hodgson), Little Malvern Letters—II: 1737-1870 (2023)

Awards
 Knight of St Gregory the Great (1990)

References

1936 births
2022 deaths
20th-century English historians
21st-century English historians
Historians of the Catholic Church
People from Birmingham, West Midlands
Knights of St. Gregory the Great